Wylewa  (Vyleva) is a village in the administrative district of Gmina Sieniawa, within Przeworsk County, Subcarpathian Voivodeship, in south-eastern Poland.

The village has a population of 846.

References

Wylewa